"En attendant ses pas" (meaning "Waiting for His Footsteps") is a song by Canadian singer Celine Dion, recorded for her 1998 French-language album, S'il suffisait d'aimer. It was written by French singer-songwriter Jean-Jacques Goldman, and produced by Goldman and Erick Benzi. "En attendant ses pas" was released as a promotional single in June 1999. It reached top ten on the airplay charts in Francophone countries and topped the chart in Quebec for four weeks.

Commercial performance
In France, "En attendant ses pas" entered the Airplay Chart on 19 June 1999 and peaked at number six on 31 July 1999. It spent three weeks at number six and nine weeks inside top ten. "En attendant ses pas" left the Airplay Top 25 on 11 September 1999, after eleven weeks on the chart.

In Quebec, the song entered the chart on 10 July 1999. "En attendant ses pas" topped it for four weeks between 18 September and 9 October 1999 and spent thirty-five weeks there in total. In Belgium Wallonia, "En attendant ses pas" peaked at number ten on the Airplay Chart on 28 September 1999, spending three weeks on the chart.

Formats and track listings
Canadian/French promotional CD single
"En attendant ses pas" – 4:07

Charts

References

Celine Dion songs
1999 singles
French-language songs
1998 songs
Songs written by Jean-Jacques Goldman
Columbia Records singles